The New Westminster Bruins were a major junior ice hockey team in the Western Hockey League.  There were two franchises that carried this name:
 1971–1981 (formerly the Estevan Bruins, now the Kamloops Blazers)
 1983–1988 (formerly the Nanaimo Islanders, now the Tri-City Americans)
Both incarnations of the franchise played at Queen's Park Arena in the Vancouver suburb of New Westminster, British Columbia.

History

First Bruins
The franchise began in 1946 as the Humboldt Indians of the original version of the Saskatchewan Junior Hockey League (1948–1966), moving to Estevan to become the Bruins in 1957. They were a founding member of the Western Canada-based Canadian Major Junior Hockey League (later renamed the Western Canada Hockey League) in 1966. The Estevan Bruins had been a successful franchise, including a loss in the 1968 Memorial Cup national championship, when team owner and coach Punch McLean moved the team to New Westminster for the 1971–72 WCHL season.

Once the team arrived in New Westminster, the success continued throughout much of the decade. The Bruins won the President's Cup four times in a row between 1975 and 1978. They made it to the Memorial Cup finals four years in a row as well, losing in 1975 and 1976 before winning it in 1977 and 1978. The WCHL was renamed the Western Hockey League for the 1978–79 WHL season. That season, after a brawl at the end of a game against  Portland in March 1979 at Queens Park Arena, some local hockey fans started to look with disfavour upon the Bruins' rough tactics, and the team's popularity began to wane. The Bruins moved to Kamloops, British Columbia, for the 1980–81 WHL season, where they would become first the Kamloops Junior Oilers and, from the 1984–85 WHL season, the Kamloops Blazers.

Second Bruins
The second incarnation of the Bruins arrived in New Westminster in 1983 from Nanaimo, British Columbia, where they had previously been known as the Nanaimo Islanders. The team originated in Calgary in 1966–67 with a stop   as the Billings Bighorns.  The team only played one season in Nanaimo before moving. The new Bruins did not enjoy the same level of success, and lasted only five seasons in New Westminster before moving to Kennewick, Washington, to become the Tri-City Americans. This franchise has never won the WHL championship in any of its incarnations.

Season-by-season records

First Bruins (1971–81)

Note: GP = games played, W = wins, L = losses, T = ties Pts = points, GF = goals for, GA = goals against

Second Bruins (1983–88)

NHL alumni
Totals include both incarnations of the Bruins

See also
List of ice hockey teams in British Columbia

References
2005–06 WHL Guide
hockeydb.com

Defunct Western Hockey League teams
Defunct ice hockey teams in British Columbia
New Westminster